Giovanni Dall'Agocchie was an Italian fencer and author who published a fencing manual titled Dell'Arte di Scrima Libri Tre ("Three Books on the Art of Defense") in 1572.

References

External links 
 Dell'Arte di Scrima -translation by William E. Wilson

Italian male fencers
Italian non-fiction writers
Italian male writers
Year of birth missing
Year of death missing
Historical fencing
Male non-fiction writers